Ken Wilson (born February 17, 1964) is an American football coach. He is the head football coach at the University of Nevada. Before becoming the head coach, he had previously coached as an assistant at Nevada for 19 seasons, from 1989 to 1998 and 2004 to 2012.

Coaching career

Assistant at Nevada
Wilson began coaching at Nevada in 1989. He spent a total of 19 seasons as an assistant coach there in two stints, from 1989 to 1998 and 2004 to 2012. In between he worked as an associate athletic director for Nevada. At Nevada he coached throughout the defense, while serving as defensive coordinator for four seasons. From 1996 to 1998 Wilson was the youngest NCAA Division I defensive coordinator.

Washington State
From 2013 to 2019, Wilson worked as the linebackers coach under Mike Leach at Washington State University.

Oregon
In 2020, Wilson joined the staff at the University of Oregon as linebackers coach. In 2021, he signed a new contract and was given the title of co-defensive coordinator while coaching the inside linebackers.

Head coach at Nevada
After spending nine seasons away from Nevada, Wilson was confirmed to be returning to the university on December 10, 2021, as head coach.

Personal life
Wilson and his wife, Heather, have a son, Tyler, who played football at Nevada, and a daughter, Baylie.

Head coaching record

References

External links
 
 Nevada profile

1964 births
Living people
American football linebackers
American football tight ends
Baseball first basemen
North Central Cardinals baseball players
North Central Cardinals football coaches
North Central Cardinals football players
Nevada Wolf Pack football coaches
New Mexico Lobos football coaches
Oregon Ducks football coaches
Washington State Cougars football coaches
People from Virginia, Illinois
Coaches of American football from Illinois
Players of American football from Illinois
Baseball players from Illinois